Vermileo opacus is a species of wormlion in the family Vermileonidae.

References

Vermileonomorpha
Insects described in 1904